Gilbert Okari is a retired Kenyan professional long-distance runner. He competed at the professional level in distances 5k through Marathon. Okari has won 26 major races and earned over US$280,000 in prize money.

Professional career 

Throughout his career, Okari competed at dozens of major track and road racing events. He has won races including the Ajc Peachtree Road Race, Beach to Beacon 10k, World's Best 10k, Lilac Bloomsday Run and Bay to Breakers. Okari has also represented Kenya in international competition.

Competition Record



References 

1978 births
Living people
Kenyan male long-distance runners